Rubus occidentalis is a species of Rubus native to eastern North America. Its common name black raspberry is shared with other closely related species. Other names occasionally used include bear's eye blackberry, black cap, black cap raspberry, and scotch cap.

Description

The leaves are pinnate, with five leaflets on leaves, strong-growing stems in their first year, and three leaflets on leaves on flowering branchlets. The round-shaped fruit is a  diameter aggregation of drupelets; it is edible, and has a high content of anthocyanins and ellagic acid.

Canes have curved, sharp thorns, while immature canes are unbranched and have a whitish bloom.

The black raspberry is related to the red raspberry Rubus idaeus and Rubus strigosus, sharing the white underside of leaves, and fruit that readily detaches from the carpel.

Habitat 

The plant grows in disturbed areas, especially those that are logged or cut. It is also found in meadows, and near streams and lakes, trails or roadways. The native range of Rubus occidentalis extends as far east as New Brunswick, as far west as Nebraska, as far north as Quebec, and as far south as Mississippi.

Pests and diseases 
Apple mosaic virus, black raspberry necrosis virus, Elsinoë veneta, raspberry bushy dwarf virus, raspberry leaf curl virus, Rhizobium radiobacter, Rhizobium rhizogenes, Didymella applanata, Monilinia fructigena, Peronospora sparsa, and Peridroma saucia all infest black raspberries.

Cultivars 
Common black raspberry cultivars include: Black Hawk, Bristol, Jewel, Cumberland, Morrison, Munger, and Logan.

Commercial growing and processing 
The center for black raspberry production is in the Willamette Valley in Oregon. Other cultivars include 'John Robertson', 'Allen', 'Jewel', 'Blackhawk', 'Macblack', 'Plum Farmer', 'Dundee', 'Hanover', and 'Huron'. The plants are summer tipped by hand, mechanically pruned in winter and then machine harvested. The yields are generally low per acre and this is why the fruits are often expensive.

The species has been used in the breeding of many Rubus hybrids; those between red and black raspberries are common under the name purple raspberries; 'Brandywine', 'Royalty', and 'Estate' are examples of purple raspberry cultivars. Wild purple raspberries have also been found in various places in northeastern North America where the two parental species co-occur and occasionally hybridize naturally.

The berries are typically dried or frozen, made into purées and juices, or processed as colorants. Fresh berries are also marketed in season. Two well-known liqueurs based predominantly on black raspberry fruit include France's Chambord Liqueur Royale de France and South Korea's various kinds of Bokbunja-ju.

See also 
 Dewberry, a sub-set of blackberries
 Rubus niveus and Rubus coreanus, related Asian species

References

External links 
 
 Biota of North America Program 2014 county distribution map
 

occidentalis
Berries
Flora of Canada
Flora of the Eastern United States
Garden plants
Medicinal plants
Plants described in 1753
Taxa named by Carl Linnaeus
Symbols of Alabama